Douglas E. Cordier (born December 6, 1953) is an American educator and politician from Montana. Cordier is a former Democratic Party member of the Montana House of Representatives, representing District 3 since 2007.

See also 
 Montana House of Representatives, District 3

References

External links
Montana House of Representatives - Douglas Cordier official MT State Legislature website
Follow the Money - Douglas Cordier
2006 campaign contributions

Educators from Montana
Members of the Montana House of Representatives
1953 births
Living people
Montana State University–Northern alumni
Politicians from Missoula, Montana
People from Columbia Falls, Montana